De-categorialization (or de-categorialisation) in linguistics refers to one of the five principles by which grammaticalization can be detected while it is taking place (according to Paul Hopper). The other four are layering, divergence, specialization, and persistence.

De-categorialization can be described as the loss of morphosyntactic properties.

References 

 Lessau, Donald A. A Dictionary of Grammaticalization. Bochum: Brockmeyer, 1994.
 Hopper, Paul J. “On some principles of grammaticization”. In Elizabeth Closs Traugott and Bernd Heine, eds. Approaches to Grammaticalization, Vol. I. Amsterdam: John Benjamins, 1991. pp. 17–36.

Linguistics